Donald Hume may refer to:

Donald Hume (rower) (1915–2001), American rower in the 1936 Olympics
Donald Charles Hume (1907–1986), English badminton player